Panjab Castes is a book based on a census report of the Panjab Province of British India by Sir Denzil Ibbetson, published in 1916. The census of the Panjab Province was carried out by Sir Denzil Ibbetson of the Indian Civil Service in 1881 and his report was published in 1883.

See also 
Thirty-five years in the Punjab
A Glossary of the Tribes and Castes of the Punjab and North-West Frontier Province

References 

1916 non-fiction books
English-language books
English non-fiction books
History of Punjab
History of Punjab, India
History of Punjab, Pakistan
Books about British India